Joseph or Joe Greene may refer to:

Sports
Joe Greene (born 1946), American football player, known as "Mean Joe Greene"
Joe Greene (baseball) (1911–1989), American catcher in Negro league baseball
Joe Greene (boxer) (born 1986), American middleweight
Joe Greene (long jumper) (born 1967), American long jump athlete

Other
Joe Greene (American songwriter) (1915–1986), American songwriter
Joe Greene (American singer), gospel/soul singer and songwriter, active in the 1970s
Joe Greene (Ontario politician) (1920–1978), Liberal legislator in Canadian House of Commons, 1963–1972
Joseph Greene (Newfoundland politician) (1890–1969), accountant and political figure in Newfoundland
Joseph Greene (writer) (1914–1990), American science fiction author and editor
Joseph N. Greene (1920–2010), US diplomat
Joseph Reay Greene (1836–1903), Irish zoologist
Joseph A. Greene, state senator in South Carolina
J. E. Greene (Joseph E. Greene, born 1944), known as Joe, American materials scientist

See also
Greene (disambiguation)
Joseph Green (disambiguation)